Hickey College was a for-profit career college in St. Louis, Missouri. It was founded in 1933 by Dr. Margaret Hickey and had two campuses on North Lindbergh Boulevard near Lambert-St. Louis International Airport.  It had nearby housing for students but over half of students come from the St. Louis area.  The college closed in 2018.

Hickey College awarded diplomas, associate degrees, and bachelor's degrees.

Student body, admissions, and outcomes 
According to Peterson's and institutional publications, Hickey College had an undergraduate population of 396.  Of 852 applicants, 615 (or 72%) were admitted.  According to College Navigator, in the most recent reporting year the graduation rate was 81%.

Academics 
Hickey College provided career-focused courses to high school graduates.  The college claimed that its programs generally offered hands-on learning opportunities that helped prepare graduates to start working immediately. Some programs offered externships as well. Students could graduate in 8–12 months by earning a diploma. Associate degree programs could be completed in 16–18 months.  Upperclassmen pursuing bachelor's degrees generally worked during the day and took evening classes.

Hickey College divides its nine major areas of study into four main categories: Business, Technology, Health Care, and Culinary/Design.

Accreditation 
Hickey College was accredited by the Accrediting Council for Independent Colleges and Schools  to award diplomas, associate degrees, and bachelor's degrees. The Veterinary Technician program was accredited by the American Veterinary Medical Association (AVMA) Committee on Veterinary Technician Education and Activities (CVTEA).

References

External links
 Official website

Graphic design schools in the United States
Former for-profit universities and colleges in the United States
Universities and colleges in St. Louis
1933 establishments in Missouri
Educational institutions disestablished in 2018
Defunct private universities and colleges in Missouri